Next Door is a 1994 American black comedy television movie starring James Woods, Randy Quaid, Kate Capshaw and Lucinda Jenney. It originally aired September 4, 1994 on the Showtime network and was made available on VHS January 17, 1995. As of January 2009, the film has yet to find a DVD release.

Plot
Matt (Woods), a sophisticated college professor and Karen (Capshaw), his schoolteacher wife, have inconsiderate neighbors (a loutish beer-swilling butcher and his wife, played by Quaid and Jenney) whose lawn sprinkler drowns their flowers. A feud erupts and as a series of tit-for-tat actions escalate, they also start to get crueler and more destructive.

Cast
James Woods as Matt Coler
Randy Quaid as Lenny Benedetti
Kate Capshaw as Karen Coler
Lucinda Jenney as Marci Benedetti
 Miles Fuelner as Bucky

References

External links
Next Door (1994 film) at Facebook

1994 films
1990s black comedy films
1994 comedy films
1994 television films
American television films
American black comedy films
Films directed by Tony Bill
Films scored by Van Dyke Parks
1990s American films